The 1946–47 Scottish Districts season is a record of all the rugby union matches for Scotland's district teams.

History

North play South on 16 November 1946. Edinburgh and South East played a combined Glasgow and West on 23 November 1946.

Edinburgh District beat Glasgow District in the Inter-City match.

Army against a 'Rest of Scotland' side on 15 February 1947.

Results

Inter-City

Glasgow District:

Edinburgh District:

Other Scottish matches

Midlands District:

North of Scotland District: 

North of Scotland District:

South of Scotland District:

Junior matches

South of Scotland District:

Edinburgh District: 

East of Scotland District:

West of Scotland District:

Trial matches

Blues Trial:

Whites Trial: 

Probables:

Possibles:

English matches

Rest of Scotland:

Army:

International matches

No touring matches this season.

References

1946–47 in Scottish rugby union
Scottish Districts seasons